The Congressional Taiwan Caucus is the largest Congressional Member Organization in the United States Congress with 229 members. The caucus focuses exclusively on improving American–Taiwanese relations.

Its counterpart in the Senate is the Senate Taiwan Caucus.

History
The caucus was founded on April 9, 2002. Congressmen Sherrod Brown (D-OH), Steve Chabot (R-OH), Dana Rohrabacher (R-CA), and Robert Wexler (D-FL) were the founding co-chairs.

Members
There is no official source available to the public regarding the accurate list of the caucus. According to public information including news reports, these Congressional members are in the caucus:

Current

Former
Fmr. Rep. Corrine Brown (D) (FL-5)- Lost 2016 election.
Fmr. Rep. Chris Van Hollen (D-MD) - now Senator since 2017
Rep. Walter Jones (R-NC)
Rep. Elijah Cummings (D) (MD)
Rep. Ed Royce (R-CA)
Rep. Mimi Walters (R-CA)
Rep. Tom Cotton (R-AR) - now Senator 
Rep. Jackie Walorski (R) (IN-2)

References

External links
List of Senate Taiwan Caucus members
List of House Taiwan Caucus members

Caucuses of the United States Congress
Taiwan–United States relations
2002 establishments in Washington, D.C.
United States friendship associations